Kodarma Lok Sabha constituency is one of the 14 Lok Sabha (parliamentary)  constituencies in Jharkhand state in eastern India. This constituency covers the entire Koderma district and parts of Hazaribagh and Giridih districts.

Assembly segments
Presently, Kodarma Lok Sabha constituency comprises the following six Vidhan Sabha (legislative assembly) segments:

Members of Parliament
1952-71: Does not exist
1977: R.L.P. Verma, Bharatiya Lok Dal
1980: R.L.P. Verma, Janata Party
1984: Tilakdhari Singh, Indian National Congress
1989: R.L.P. Verma, Bharatiya Janata Party
1991: Mumtaz Ansari, Janata Dal
1996: R.L.P. Verma, Bharatiya Janata Party
1998: R.L.P. Verma, Bharatiya Janata Party
1999: Tilakdhari Singh, Indian National Congress
2004: Babu Lal Marandi, Bharatiya Janata Party
2006: Babu Lal Marandi, Independent (Bypolls)
2009: Babu Lal Marandi, Jharkhand Vikas Morcha (Prajatantrik)
2014: Ravindra Kumar Ray, Bharatiya Janata Party
 2019: Annapurna Devi Yadav, Bharatiya Janata Party

Election results

General Election 2019

General Election 2014

See also
 Koderma
 Koderma district
 List of Constituencies of the Lok Sabha

Notes

External links
Kodarma lok sabha  constituency election 2019 result details

Lok Sabha constituencies in Jharkhand
Koderma district
Giridih district